Lleyton Glynn Hewitt  (born 24 February 1981) is an Australian former world No. 1 tennis player. He is the most recent Australian man to win a major singles title, with two at the 2001 US Open and 2002 Wimbledon Championships. He won 30 singles titles and 3 doubles titles, with highlights being the 2001 US Open and 2002 Wimbledon singles titles, the 2000 US Open men's doubles title, back-to-back Tour Finals titles in 2001 and 2002, and the Davis Cup with Australia in 1999 and 2003. Between 1997 and 2016, Hewitt contested twenty consecutive Australian Open men's singles tournaments, his best result being runner-up in 2005. He was also the runner-up at the 2004 US Open.

Early life 
Hewitt was born in Adelaide, South Australia. His father, Glynn, is a former Australian Rules Football player, and his mother, Cherilyn, was a physical education teacher. His younger sister is Jaslyn Hewitt, a former tennis coach and bodybuilder and his brother-in-law (Jaslyn's husband) is Rob Shehadie. Hewitt also played Australian Football until the age of 13, when he decided to pursue a tennis career. His junior tennis club was Seaside Tennis Club in Henley Beach. He was also coached by Peter Smith at Denman Tennis Club in Mitcham.

Tennis career 
Hewitt commenced his professional career in 1998. He became one of the youngest winners of an Association of Tennis Professionals (ATP) tournament when he won the 1998 Next Generation Adelaide International, defeating Jason Stoltenberg in the final, having defeated Andre Agassi in the semi-finals. Both Aaron Krickstein winning Tel Aviv in 1983 and Michael Chang winning San Francisco in 1988 were younger than Hewitt when they claimed their first ATP title. Hewitt then left Immanuel College to concentrate on his tennis career. He was an Australian Institute of Sport scholarship holder.
He finished his professional tennis career on 24 January 2016 after 20 straight Australian Open appearances. His last professional singles match was against David Ferrer in the second round of the 2016 Australian Open at the Rod Laver Arena on 21 January 2016. In 2022, Lleyton Hewitt was inducted into the ‘International Tennis Hall of Fame.’

Junior years and first Grand Slam appearance
As a junior Hewitt posted a 44–19 record in singles and reached as high as No. 17 in the world in 1997 (and No. 13 in doubles).

Junior singles titles

2000: US Open doubles title, Wimbledon mixed doubles and Davis Cup finals 
In 2000, Hewitt reached his first Grand Slam final at the Wimbledon mixed doubles partnering Belgian Kim Clijsters, his then girlfriend. They lost the match, to Americans Kimberly Po and Donald Johnson. Hewitt later won his first Grand Slam title at the US Open when he along with Max Mirnyi claimed the men's doubles championship, thus becoming the youngest male (at 19 years, 6 months) to win a Grand Slam doubles crown in the open era. At the end of the year, Hewitt became the first teenager in ATP history to qualify for the year-end Tennis Masters Cup (ATP World Tour Finals).

2001: US Open title, Masters Cup trophy, third Davis Cup final and world No. 1
Hewitt started off the 2001 season well by winning the Medibank International in Sydney, and went on to win tournaments in London (Queen's Club) and 's-Hertogenbosch. He captured his first Grand Slam singles title at the US Open in 2001, when he beat former world No. 1 Yevgeny Kafelnikov in the semi-finals and defeated then four-time champion Pete Sampras the next day in straight sets. This win made Hewitt the most recent male player to win a Grand Slam singles and doubles title during his career. The Australian went on to win the Tokyo Open and again qualify for the year-end Tennis Masters Cup held in Sydney. During the tournament, Hewitt won all matches in his group. He then went on to defeat Sébastien Grosjean in the final to take the title and gain the No. 1 ranking.

Hewitt won a total of six titles in 2001.

2002: Wimbledon victory and maintaining the No. 1 spot
The year 2002 was once again a solid year for Hewitt, winning three titles in San Jose, Indian Wells and London (Queen's Club). He followed his 2001 US Open win by capturing the Wimbledon singles title. He defeated Jonas Björkman, Grégory Carraz, Julian Knowle, Mikhail Youzhny, Sjeng Schalken and home favourite Tim Henman before dominating first-time finalist David Nalbandian in straight sets; Hewitt lost only two sets (both to Schalken) throughout the championship. His victory reinforced the idea that, although the tournament had tended to be dominated by serve-and-volleyers, a baseliner could still triumph on grass (Hewitt was the first 'baseliner' to win the tournament since Agassi in 1992).

For his third straight year, he qualified for the year-end Tennis Masters Cup, held in Shanghai, and successfully defended his title by defeating Juan Carlos Ferrero in the final. Hewitt's win helped him finish the year ranked No. 1 for a second straight year.

2003: Second Masters and Davis Cup titles, Hopman Cup final
In 2003, Hewitt defeated former No. 1 Gustavo Kuerten for the championship at Indian Wells. But at Wimbledon, as the defending champion, Hewitt lost in the first round to qualifier Ivo Karlović. Hewitt became the first defending Wimbledon men's champion in the open era to lose in the first round. Only once before in the tournament's 126-year history had a defending men's champion lost in the opening round, in 1967, when Manuel Santana was beaten by Charlie Pasarell. Hewitt was only the third defending Grand Slam champion in the open era to lose in the first round, after Boris Becker at the 1997 Australian Open and Patrick Rafter at the 1999 US Open. After Wimbledon in 2003, Hewitt lost in the final of the tournament in Los Angeles, the second round of the ATP Masters Series tournament in Montreal, and the first round of the ATP Masters Series tournament in Cincinnati. At the US Open, Hewitt lost in the quarterfinals to Juan Carlos Ferrero. Hewitt played only Davis Cup matches for the remainder of the year, recording five-set wins over Roger Federer and Juan Carlos Ferrero in the semi-finals and final respectively, as Australia went on to win the Davis Cup. Hewitt used much of his spare time in late 2003 to bulk up, gaining 7 kg.

2004: US Open, Masters Cup and World Team Cup finals
In 2004, Hewitt became the first man in history to lose in each Grand Slam singles tournament to the eventual champion. At the Australian Open, he was defeated in the fourth round by Swiss Roger Federer. At the French Open, he was defeated in a quarterfinal by Argentine Gastón Gaudio. At Wimbledon, he was defeated in a quarterfinal by Federer, and at the US Open, he was defeated in the final by Federer, losing two out of the three sets at love. At the year ending 2004 Tennis Masters Cup, Hewitt defeated Andy Roddick to advance to the final, but was yet again defeated by defending champion Federer.

2005: Australian Open final

In 2005, Hewitt won his only title at the Sydney Medibank International defeating little-known Czech player Ivo Minář. Hewitt spent much time in the late stages of 2004 working with his former coach and good friend, Roger Rasheed, on bulking up his physique. His hard work paid off during the Australian summer, when he defeated an in-form No. 2 Andy Roddick to reach his first Australian Open final in 2005. He was the first Australian player to reach the final since Pat Cash in 1988. In the final, he faced fourth seed, Marat Safin, who had defeated No. 1 and defending champion Roger Federer in the semi-finals. After easily taking the first set, he was defeated by the Russian despite being up a break in the third set.

At Wimbledon, Hewitt reached the semi-finals, but lost to eventual champion Federer. Two months later, Hewitt again lost to Federer in the US Open semi-final, although this time he was able to take one set from the Swiss. Hewitt had at this point lost to the eventual champion at seven consecutive Grand Slam tournaments he played, (he missed the 2005 French Open because of injury). Hewitt pulled out of the Tennis Masters Cup tournament in Shanghai in November 2005 so that he could be with his wife Bec, who was due to give birth.

2006: 25th career title 
Hewitt was defeated in the second round of the 2006 Australian Open by Juan Ignacio Chela of Argentina. He then reached the finals of the San Jose and Las Vegas tournaments, losing to British youngster Andy Murray and American James Blake, respectively. But he lost to Tim Henman in the second round of the Miami Masters, a player he had defeated eight times previously in as many matches. At the 2006 French Open, Hewitt reached the fourth round, where he lost to defending champion and eventual winner Rafael Nadal in four sets.

Hewitt won his first tournament of 2006 (after a 17-month hiatus from winning a tournament), when he beat Blake in the final of the Queen's Club Championships. This was his fourth title there, equalling the records of John McEnroe and Boris Becker. During the 2006 Wimbledon Championships, Hewitt survived a five-set match against South Korea's Hyung-Taik Lee that was played over two days. He then defeated Olivier Rochus and David Ferrer, before losing to Marcos Baghdatis in the quarterfinals. At the 2006 Legg Mason Tennis Classic in Washington, D.C., Hewitt was defeated by Arnaud Clément in the quarterfinals, after defeating Vincent Spadea in the second round and Denis Gremelmayr in the third round.

Hewitt participated at the 2006 US Open, despite having an injured knee. Hewitt won his first three matches in straight sets against, respectively, Albert Montañés, Jan Hernych, and Novak Djokovic. He defeated Richard Gasquet in five sets to advance to the quarterfinals for the seventh consecutive year. He then lost to Roddick.

2007: 26th career title

At the 2007 Australian Open, Hewitt lost in the third round to tenth-seeded Chilean and eventual runner-up Fernando González. With his win in Las Vegas in March, Hewitt had won at least one ATP title annually for ten consecutive years. This was a record among active players at the time. Hewitt reached the 2007 Hamburg Masters semi-finals, where he pushed eventual finalist Rafael Nadal to three sets. At the 2007 French Open, Hewitt, for the second straight time lost in the fourth round to Nadal. At the 2007 Wimbledon Championships, Hewitt won his first three matches, including a four-set third round victory over Guillermo Cañas. He then faced fourth seed Novak Djokovic in the fourth round, which he lost.

After Wimbledon, it was announced that he had hired former Australian tennis pro Tony Roche to coach him during Grand Slam and Masters tournaments in 2007 and 2008. At the Masters tournaments in Montréal and Cincinnati Hewitt reached the quarterfinals and semi-finals, respectively. In both cases, he lost to Roger Federer.

He was seeded 16th at the 2007 US Open, but for the first time in eight consecutive appearances at Flushing Meadows, he did not reach the quarterfinals or further. He lost in the second round to Argentine Agustín Calleri.

2008: Injuries and year without titles
At the 2008 Australian Open, he advanced to the fourth round as the 19th seed, defeating 15th-seeded and 2006 Australian Open finalist Marcos Baghdatis in a thrilling third-round match. The 282-minute match started at 11:52 pm and ended at 4:34 am the following morning. It was a characteristically "gutsy" performance and cemented Hewitt's reputation as a tough competitor. Hewitt lost his fourth-round match in straight sets to third-seeded and eventual champion Novak Djokovic.

A hip injury Hewitt acquired in March 2008 affected his preparation for the French Open and forced the loss of 300 rankings points as Hewitt was unable to defend his semi-final appearance at the Hamburg Masters, as well as compete in supplementary tournaments. However, Hewitt made the third round at Roland Garros, before losing a five-set thriller to fifth seed David Ferrer.

Despite his ongoing hip problem, Hewitt was able to compete at the Queens Club Championship with moderate success, falling to second seed Novak Djokovic in the quarterfinals. His good form continued into Wimbledon, Hewitt making the fourth round for the second successive year, before losing to No. 1 and top seed Roger Federer.

After Wimbledon, Hewitt elected to miss the Montreal and Cincinnati Masters in an effort to give his hip sufficient rest to enable him to play at the 2008 Beijing Olympics, where he defeated Jonas Björkman in the first round before losing to second seed Rafael Nadal. However, the more notable incident in the Olympics occurred in Hewitt's opening-round doubles match with Chris Guccione against Argentines Juan Mónaco and Agustín Calleri. The match went to an advantage third set with Hewitt and Guccione prevailing 18–16. After the Olympics, due to the further damage Hewitt's hip sustained at the Olympics, he was left with no option but to pull out of the US Open and skip the rest of the season to have hip surgery. 2008 was the first year since 1997 in which Hewitt did not win a title.

2009: 27th career title, 500 career match wins, Wimbledon quarterfinal and return to Top 20
After returning from hip surgery, Hewitt played his first match in 2009 at the Hopman Cup, where he defeated Nicolas Kiefer in three sets. Hewitt then participated in the Medibank International Sydney, winning his first two matches, but losing in the quarterfinals to David Nalbandian. Hewitt then went on to play in the 2009 Australian Open, where he was unseeded in a Grand Slam for the first time since 2000. He faced Fernando González in the first round and lost in five sets.

At the tournament in Memphis, he caused an upset in the first round by defeating James Blake in three sets. He then defeated fellow Australian Chris Guccione in the second round and Christophe Rochus in the quarterfinals. He faced Andy Roddick in the semi-finals, but lost in a close match. Hewitt then lost in the first round of Delray Beach to Yen-Hsun Lu, the eighth seed. Hewitt also competed in the BNP Paribas Open in Indian Wells, California, and reached the second round, being defeated by Fernando González. At the Sony Ericsson Open in Miami, Hewitt played Israeli Dudi Sela in the first round. Hewitt lost the first set, before recovering to win the match. Hewitt was then defeated by seventh seed Gilles Simon of France in straight sets.

At the 2009 U.S. Men's Clay Court Championships, Hewitt defeated seventh seed Diego Junqueira. Hewitt advanced to the quarterfinals after defeating Sergio Roitman in just 57 minutes, and then Guillermo García-López to advance to the semi-finals, where he defeated Evgeny Korolev. He defeated Wayne Odesnik in the final, for his first title since 2007 and his first clay-court title in a decade. Hewitt entered the Monte Carlo Masters as a wild card. He lost in the first round to Marat Safin. Hewitt admitted to running out of energy in the second set. 

At the 2009 BMW Open, Hewitt recorded his 500th career win after defeating Philipp Petzschner in the first round, becoming one of only four active players to achieve this milestone; the others being Roger Federer and Carlos Moyá. Andy Roddick would later achieve this feat at the 2009 Legg Mason Tennis Classic Tournament in Washington, D.C. In the 2009 French Open, he defeated 26th seed Ivo Karlović in five sets in the first round, and then defeated Andrey Golubev in the second. He lost to No. 1 Rafael Nadal in the third round. His next tournament was the 2009 Aegon Championships in London. He was 15th seed and drew Eduardo Schwank in the first round, who he easily dispatched. In the second round, he went three sets against Portuguese Frederico Gil. Hewitt dropped the first set, but went on to win. Former rival Andy Roddick awaited Hewitt in the third round, and the match certainly did not disappoint. As they have many times in the past, the former No. 1 players battled through a tough and intense match, which Roddick won. 

In the 2009 Wimbledon Championships, Hewitt faced the prospect of Rafael Nadal in the second round. However, Nadal withdrew due to injury, and his slot was replaced by No. 5 Juan Martín del Potro. Hewitt defeated American Robby Ginepri in the first round. Hewitt used his strong service game to advantage, losing only one service game the entire match. He upended del Potro in straight sets. The third round also produced a straight-set victory for Hewitt, as he defeated Philipp Petzschner. He reversed a two-set deficit to defeat Radek Štěpánek in the fourth round. It was another classic Hewitt fightback to thrill the many Australians on hand to witness the match. His Cinderella run ended in the quarterfinals against sixth seed Andy Roddick. It was a five-set thriller which featured two tiebreaks. Hewitt lost a heartbreaking 3–6, 7–6 (10), 6–7 (1), 6–4, 4–6 match. It was the first time Hewitt had reached the quarterfinals of a Major since the 2006 U.S. Open.

After an extended break, Hewitt began working his way into the U.S Open series by playing in Washington at the Legg Mason Classic. There Hewitt made it into the third round, before losing in a three-set battle with Juan Martín del Potro. At the Montreal Masters, Hewitt lost in the first round to former No. 1 Juan Carlos Ferrero. Cincinnati saw Hewitt reach the quarterfinals for the sixth time, where he lost to Roger Federer in straight sets. During the first round of the tournament, Hewitt showed his trademark fighting abilities by saving two match points to win against an in-form Robin Söderling. At the U.S Open, Hewitt progressed into the third round, where he played Federer for the 23rd time of their decade-long rivalry. Hewitt managed to take the first set 6–4 from Federer, before the 15-time Grand Slam champion took control of the second. The third set was tight, and both players saved multiple break points. Federer eventually prevailed over the match in four sets.

In late September, Hewitt travelled to Malaysia for his first time to take part in the inaugural Malaysian Open held in Kuala Lumpur. The new tournament was part of the ATP's new dedicated Asian swing. Hewitt lost in the first round to Swedish player Joachim Johansson. In Tokyo, Hewitt was drawn to once again meet del Potro in the quarterfinals, but was given a clear path when del Potro was knocked out by qualifier Édouard Roger-Vasselin in the first round. After defeating Fabrice Santoro in the second round, Hewitt downed Roger-Vasselin, to reach his first semi-finals since winning the US Men's Clay Court Championships in April, but lost to Mikhail Youzhny. He then competed in the 2009 Shanghai ATP Masters 1000, where he won in the first round, defeating John Isner, before losing to Gaël Monfils.

2010: 28th career title and victory over Federer

Hewitt began his 2010 season partnering Samantha Stosur at the Hopman Cup. The Australians were the top seeds for the exhibition tournament. They, however, fared worse than expected, losing ties against Romania and Spain, and therefore failing to reach the final.

He was seeded fourth in the Medibank International and, like the previous year, reached the quarterfinals, losing to eventual champion Marcos Baghdatis. At the 2010 Australian Open, he lost to Roger Federer in the fourth round.

A week after his exit from the Australian Open, Hewitt announced at a press conference at Melbourne Park that he underwent another hip operation similar to his left hip operation this time on his right hip on 28 January 2010 in Hobart.

Hewitt returned to the tour at the U.S. Men's Clay Court Championships as the singles defending champion. He won his first match since the Australian Open, partnering coach Nathan Healey in the doubles, defeating James Cerretani and Adil Shamasdin, but lost to top seeds the Bryan brothers in the semi-finals. Hewitt received a first-round bye, as he was seeded fourth in singles. In his first match, against lucky loser Somdev Devvarman, Hewitt dropped the first set, before battling to win in three sets. He then lost to Juan Ignacio Chela. Hewitt's next tournament was scheduled to be the Monte-Carlo Rolex Masters. However, he withdrew due to a recurring injury.

Hewitt then reached the second round in Barcelona, before losing to Eduardo Schwank, and lost in the second round of the Internazionali BNL d'Italia to Guillermo García-López. Hewitt then travelled back to Australia to participate in a Davis Cup tie against Japan, winning his two singles matches.

At the French Open, Hewitt reached the third round, before losing to Rafael Nadal, who went on to win the title without dropping a set and take the No. 1 ranking.

On 13 June, Hewitt defeated Roger Federer in the final of the Gerry Weber Open in Halle, Germany, a grass-court tuneup for Wimbledon Championships. The win was Hewitt's first over Federer since 2003 and snapped a 15-match losing streak against the Swiss.

At Wimbledon, Hewitt was seeded 15th and lost to third seed, Novak Djokovic in the fourth round. After dropping the first two sets, Hewitt took advantage of a stomach illness had by Djokovic to take the third set. However, Hewitt could not mount a comeback, and ended up losing in four sets.

At the Atlanta Tennis Championship, Hewitt lost in the first round to Lukáš Lacko. After receiving a first-round bye at the Legg Mason Classic, Hewitt retired in the second round due to a leg injury. He pulled out of the Rogers Cup in Toronto to recover, and returned in Cincinnati. Hewitt defeated Yen-Hsun Lu in the opening round, before losing in three sets to fifth seed Robin Söderling.

Hewitt was 32nd seed at the US Open and lost his first-round match to Paul-Henri Mathieu in five sets. It was his earliest exit at the US Open. He withdrew from the Asian hard-court swing due to a wrist injury suffered during the Australian Davis Cup playoff loss to Belgium.

2011: Surgery and out of Top 100
Hewitt began his 15th season on the ATP Tour at the Hopman Cup in Perth. He defeated his Belgian opponent Ruben Bemelmans and went on to win the tie for Australia with a three-set victory in the mixed doubles, partnering Alicia Molik. He next played No. 3 Novak Djokovic, but lost in straight sets. For his final singles match of the tournament, he played Kazakhstani Andrey Golubev, defeating him in straight sets.

After the Hopman Cup, Hewitt competed in the AAMI Kooyong Classic, an exhibitional tournament in the build-up to the Australian Open. He started the tournament solidly, taking out third seed Mikhail Youzhny. In the second round, he defeated Russian Nikolay Davydenko. In the final, he defeated Frenchman Gaël Monfils. It was the first time that Hewitt had played in the tournament.

At the 2011 Australian Open, Hewitt was defeated in the first round in five sets by Argentina's David Nalbandian. Hewitt was up two sets to one and during the fourth set had the chance to finish off the match, when the scores were 3–1 and 0–40 in Hewitt's favour, but failed to capitalise on the situation. Furthermore, Hewitt had two match point opportunities in the final set to close out victory. However, one of these was met with an excellent drop shot from Nalbandian, and he went on to save the other, securing victory.

After the Australian Open, Hewitt participated in the SAP Open, an ATP World Tour 250 event. He defeated his first-round opponent Björn Phau, and proceeded to the second round against Brian Dabul. Hewitt had some problems with Dabul, losing the first set, but managed to defeat him. In the quarterfinals, Hewitt played against former US Open champion Juan Martín del Potro, who was on a comeback from a wrist injury. In a weak performance, Hewitt lost.

The next tournament that Hewitt took part in was the Regions Morgan Keegan Championships and the Cellular South Cup, an ATP World Tour 500 event in Memphis, Tennessee. Hewitt played Lu Yen-Hsun in the opening round, which he won. He advanced to the second round against Adrian Mannarino. Despite losing the first set, Hewitt defeated Mannarino. In the quarterfinals, Hewitt played top seed Andy Roddick. Despite being a set up, Hewitt lost the match.

Hewitt then played in the 2011 BNP Paribas Open, an ATP World Tour Masters 1000 event. His first-round opponent was Chinese Taipei's Lu Yen-Hsun. This was the second time in a row the two had played each other in the first round, and he suffered a shock defeat. This was to be Hewitt's last event on the ATP Tour for over three months after he underwent surgery on his left foot. He made his comeback at the 2011 Gerry Weber Open in Halle, Germany, where he returned as defending champion. He was originally scheduled to face top seed Roger Federer in the opening round. However, the Swiss withdrew after reaching the final of the French Open. Hewitt therefore took on an alternate from Argentina, Leonardo Mayer and came through the match comfortably.  In the second round, he played Andreas Seppi and defeated him. However, Hewitt's reign as champion of Halle came to an end at the hands of home favourite Philipp Kohlschreiber, when the Australian went down in straight sets. During this match, Hewitt turned his ankle when he came in to the net to try to reach a net cord ball. The following week, Hewitt had to retire during a first round match at the Aegon International against Olivier Rochus. This was a result of the niggling ankle injury he had picked up at Halle the week before.

Hewitt came into Wimbledon with doubts over his fitness and condition and was unseeded in the 2011 Wimbledon Championships draw. Hewitt faced Kei Nishikori of Japan in the first round and won in four close sets. In the second round, Hewitt faced fifth seed Robin Söderling. Hewitt won the first set in a tiebreak and the second set. Söderling fought back to take the match in five sets.

Hewitt's next tournament was the 2011 Atlanta Tennis Championships, an ATP World Tour 250 event and first event on the US hard-court swing. Hewitt won his first-round match against the American qualifier Phillip Simmonds in straight sets to advance to the second round. He went on to lose his second round encounter against the American qualifier Rajeev Ram. After this defeat, Hewitt who had been scheduled to play in Los Angeles the following week, opted not to take up the offer of a wildcard and withdrew from the event to recover from his foot injury. He then was offered a wild card to play at the 2011 US Open, but was unable to play due to foot injury which ended his season.

2012: First ATP final in two years
Hewitt began his 2012 season at the Hopman Cup. In the opening singles tie against Spain, Hewitt lost in singles to Fernando Verdasco. For the mixed doubles match, Hewitt partnered with Jarmila Gajdošová. They lost the match in three sets 6–3, 3–6, 9–11, despite being 5–1 up in the final set tie-breaker. In the second tie against France, Hewitt lost to Richard Gasquet in singles and in straight sets in mixed doubles. In the final tie against China, Hewitt defeated Wu Di in straight sets and won the mixed doubles match. His next tournament was the Apia International, where he lost in the first round against Serbian fifth seed Viktor Troicki.

His next tournament was the 2012 Australian Open. In doubles, partnering countryman Peter Luczak, the Aussies went until the 2nd round where they lost in straight sets to the Bryan Twins. In singles, where he was awarded a wildcard, Hewitt won his first round match defeating unseeded Cedrik-Marcel Stebe in almost four hours. Long-time rival Andy Roddick, who was seeded 15th, awaited Hewitt in the second round. After dropping the first set, Hewitt won the next two. Roddick then retired due to a groin injury and Hewitt advanced. In the third round, he faced the 23rd seed Milos Raonic of Canada. Playing at night in front of a boisterous Aussie crowd, Hewitt dispatched Raonic in 3 hours 6 minutes. In the 4th round, Hewitt faced returning champ and No. 1-ranked Novak Djokovic. Djokovic won the 1st two sets fairly easily, and was leading 3–0 in the 3rd set when Hewitt launched a spirited comeback, taking the set 6–4. Djokovic eventually prevailed however, winning the match in four sets, ending Hewitt's run. Hewitt's two next matches were in February at the Davis Cup, where he won one singles and one doubles match partnering Chris Guccione, what awarded Australia to go to the playoffs once more. After this Hewitt needed an operation to have a plate inserted in his toe.

Hewitt returned with a wildcard at the French Open where he lost in the first round to Blaž Kavčič. After this, Hewitt began his grass season at Queen's Club Championships. He lost in the 1st round to Croatian Ivo Karlović. Hewitt's next tournament was Wimbledon, where he was defeated in the first round by 5th seed Jo-Wilfried Tsonga. During this match, ITF released wild cards for the 2012 Olympics, and Hewitt's name was in the singles list, marking his third appearance at the Olympic Games (2000, 2008 and now). After his loss against Tsonga, Hewitt played doubles at Wimbledon partnering countryman Chris Guccione, where they made the 3rd round before losing in 4 sets.

After Wimbledon, viewing to prepare for the Olympics, Hewitt was granted a wild card at Newport. In the opening round, he defeated Canadian Vasek Pospisil. In the 2nd round, he won in three sets, ousting American Tim Smyczek. In his next match, the Aussie won against Israeli Dudi Sela. With this win, Hewitt went on to the semi-final (his first since Halle 2010), where he was victorious over American Rajeev Ram. He lost to top seeded John Isner in the final.

Playing in the Olympics, Hewitt was drawn against Sergiy Stakhovsky and won. Marin Čilić, seeded 13th, awaited in the second round and Hewitt dispatched the Croat in two sets to advance to the third round. There, he met 2nd seed Novak Djokovic. After losing the first set, Djokovic overpowered Hewitt to take the final two sets and eliminate Hewitt from the tournament. In the mixed doubles, he and Sam Stosur reached the quarterfinals, where they lost two sets to one to Britain's Andy Murray and Laura Robson.

Beginning the American hard court season, Hewitt received a WC to the Cincinnati Masters, where he won against Mikhail Youzhny in the 1st round before losing to Viktor Troicki in the 2nd round. The Aussie's next tournament was the US Open, where he received a WC, completing the "Wild Card Slam" (received wild cards in all of the four Grand Slams in 2012). In the 1st round, Hewitt met Tobias Kamke, winning his first match at Flushing Meadows since 2009. In the 2nd round, Hewitt won a marathon five sets match against Gilles Müller. In the 3rd round, Hewitt lost to 4th seed and No. 5-ranked David Ferrer, despite having set points in the 1st set.

2013: Five top ten wins and hope for resurgence

Hewitt started off 2013 in Brisbane, where he lost in second round against Denis Istomin in straight sets. Prior to the Australian Open, Hewitt took part in the exhibition tournament AAMI Kooyong Classic, in which he defeated Milos Raonic, Tomáš Berdych, and Juan Martín del Potro en route to claim his second title. Due to his excellent result in the preparation event before the 2013 Australian Open, people had high expectations of Hewitt. However, he suffered his sixth first-round exit in his home slam to No. 9 Janko Tipsarević in straight sets. Hewitt then played in the Davis Cup against Taiwan and won in both singles and doubles.

He played the SAP Open next in San Jose, losing his second-round match to third-seeded American Sam Querrey in a three-set thriller. He also claimed a wild card to play in doubles with fellow Aussie Marinko Matosevic, beating the No. 1 American duo Mike Bryan and Bob Bryan in the quarterfinals, before losing to Xavier Malisse and Frank Moser in the final. With Hewitt's doubles run in the tournament, he surpassed the 100-wins mark in doubles. He next participated in the U.S. National Indoor Tennis Championships in Memphis. He faced Yen-Hsun Lu in the opening round, saving two match points to edge Lu in three sets. He lost to Denis Istomin, again in the second round.

Hewitt moved on to play the BNP Paribas Open in Indian Wells, ousting Lukáš Rosol and 15th seed John Isner, before losing to No. 18 Stanislas Wawrinka. Hewitt lost to Gilles Simon in the opening round at Roland Garros. After winning the first two sets, he succumbed in five. In his first match at the Aegon Championships Queen's Club, he beat Mike Russell in three sets. He followed this with victory over Grigor Dimitrov in straight sets. He then defeated Sam Querrey to book a place in the quarterfinals. In the quarterfinals, he defeated No. 8 Juan Martín del Potro in three sets, to progress to the semi-finals. Hewitt played Marin Čilić in the semi-finals, but was beaten in three sets. At Wimbledon, Hewitt beat top ten player Stanislas Wawrinka in the first round in straight sets. He was then defeated by German qualifier Dustin Brown in the second round in four sets.

In July 2013, he made it to his first final of the year at the Hall-of-Fame Championships, defeating Matthew Ebden, Prakash Amritraj, Jan Hernych, and John Isner on the way. He was beaten by Nicolas Mahut having served for the championship at 5–4 in the second set. His form continued at the Atlanta Open, defeating Édouard Roger-Vasselin 6–4, 6–4, Rhyne Williams 7–6, 6–4 and Ivan Dodig 1–6, 6–3, 6–0 in the quarterfinals. Hewitt played John Isner in the semi-finals, but lost in three tough sets. His US Open run started well, beating Brian Baker in four sets and following up with a five-set epic upset against fellow former US Open champion Juan Martín del Potro, where Hewitt came back from two sets to one down against the No. 6, winning a fourth set tiebreak and sealing the match 6–1 in the fifth. He beat Evgeny Donskoy in the third round to set up a fourth round match with Mikhail Youzhny. Hewitt then lost to Youzhny 3–6, 6–3, 7–6, 4–6, 7–5, despite leading 4–1 in the fourth set and serving for the match at 5–3 in the fifth set. A measure of the success of Hewitt's 2013 season is the fact that he won the Newcombe medal as the most outstanding Australian tennis player in 2013, a year in which he returned to the world's top 100.

2014: 30th career title, 600 wins and return to top 40
Hewitt kicked off the 2014 season as an unseeded entrant into the 2014 Brisbane International. He won his first round match against Thanasi Kokkinakis in straight sets. His second round match was against sixth seed Feliciano López, whom he defeated. His quarterfinal encounter against qualifier Marius Copil resulted in a straight-set victory. In the semi-finals Hewitt faced second seed Kei Nishikori. Hewitt prevailed, thus setting the final match against seventeen–time Grand Slam winner Roger Federer. Federer held an 18–8 record head–to–head against Hewitt. Hewitt managed to turn the tide on Federer, winning 6–1, 4–6, 6–3 and capturing the title, which was his 29th and first since 2010. As a result, his rank increased from 60th to 43rd, becoming Australian number one again.
At AAMI Classic, he defeated Andy Murray in two tiebreaks.

In the 2014 Australian Open, Hewitt played both singles and doubles as an unseeded player. In his first round singles match, he lost in five sets to No. 24 seed Andreas Seppi. In doubles action, Hewitt partnered with retired and former Australian number one Patrick Rafter. However, the duo did not manage to win their first round match against Eric Butorac and Raven Klaasen, losing 4–6, 5–7. After the tournament, Hewitt's singles rank rose to No. 38, his highest position since late 2010. Hewitt battled for his 600th ATP win, becoming only the third active player to reach that milestone by beating Robin Haase in the 1st Round of the 2014 Sony Open Tennis.

After the Australian Open, Hewitt played as part of the Australian representative team for the Davis Cup. He lost his match against Jo-Wilfried Tsonga 3–6, 2–6, 6–7 (2–7). He then competed in the 2014 U.S. National Indoor Tennis Championships in Memphis in the United States of America. With a bye in the Round of 32, he went on to defeat Marcos Baghdatis in three sets 1–6, 6–2, 6–0 before losing to Michael Russell 3–6, 6–7 (6–8). His next tournament was the Delray Beach Tournament where he beat Bradley Klahn in straight sets 6–3, 6–1. He then versed his compatriot Marinko Matosevic but was forced to retire after injuring his shoulder. The score was 6–7 (2–7).

Hewitt played at the BNP Paribas Open where he defeated Matthew Ebden 7–6(7–2), 3–6, 6–3. He then lost to Kevin Anderson 6–7(5–7), 4–6. Hewitt then played at the Sony Open Tennis where he defeated Robin Haase in the Round of 128, 3–6, 6–3, 6–3. He then subsequently lost to No. 1 Rafael Nadal. Hewitt then played at the U.S. Men's Clay Court Championships where he lost in Round of 16 to Sam Querrey.

Hewitt suffered three consecutive first round losses at the BMW Open by FWU AG to Albert Ramos-Vinolas 7–6(6), 1–6, 0–6, Mutua Madrid Open to Santiago Giraldo 5–7, 6–4, 2–6 and at the French Open Roland Garros to Carlos Berlocq 6–3, 2–6, 1–6, 4–6. This ended Hewitt's clay court season.

At the Aegon Championships, Hewitt won in the first round against Daniel Gimeno-Traver in straight sets before losing to Feliciano Lopez in straight sets 3–6, 4–6. Following this tournament, Hewitt played at Wimbledon where he won in the first round against Michal Przysiezny, 6–2, 6–7 (14–16), 6–1, 6–4 before losing in the second round in five sets to Jerzy Janowicz, 5–7, 4–6, 7–6(7), 6–4, 3–6.

He next competed at the Newport Hall of Fame Tennis Championships where he was seeded third. Hewitt advanced to the final for the third consecutive year where he would face Ivo Karlovic. Hewitt slayed his Newport demons and defeated the big serving Croat in three sets: 6–3, 6–7(4), 7–6(3). It was his 30th career singles title. Hewitt went on to win the doubles title with countryman Chris Guccione later that same day.

On 10 August 2014, Hewitt defeated Austria's Jürgen Melzer in three sets (3–6, 6–4, 6–4) at the Cincinnati Masters to reach 610 wins on the ATP Tour. That enabled him to rise to number 19 on the all-time wins list, topping Björn Borg and Yevgeny Kafelnikov in the process.

2015: Farewell year

Hewitt began his 2015 season as the defending champion of the Brisbane International. In the first round he was defeated in straight sets (3–6, 2–6) by fellow Australian Sam Groth in 58 minutes. As a result, he dropped from rank No. 50 to No. 84 and lost his position of No. 1 Australian which he had held for many consecutive months. Hewitt played the first Fast4 short-form tennis exhibition match against Roger Federer but lost in five sets.

Hewitt then played his 19th consecutive Australian Open appearance which is the fourth longest streak at any Grand Slam. In the first round he beat wild card Zhang Ze in 4 sets. He then lost in five sets to his second round opponent Benjamin Becker despite winning the first two sets.

At a media conference, Hewitt mentioned plans to retire after the 2016 Australian Open to become the captain of the Australian Davis Cup team after Pat Rafter moved on from the position, becoming the seventh man to captain the team. "I had thought long and hard and I plan to play the Australian Open next year and then finish," he said. "At the moment, [the Davis Cup] is the main focus for us and then I will be looking towards the grass court season and finishing here in Melbourne, which would be special to play 20 Australian Opens". It will be Australia's first time in the world group of the Davis Cup in six years. Rafter and John Newcombe are the only other two Australian men to have been ranked No. 1 since ranks were established in 1973.

Hewitt then played the Miami Open and lost in the first round to Thomaz Bellucci in three sets. He was then awarded a wildcard to the 2015 U.S. Men's Clay Court Championships where he also lost in the first round to Go Soeda.

Hewitt skipped the remainder of the clay court season including the 2015 French Open, instead opting to focus on the grass season and Wimbledon. He began his grass court season at the 2015 Topshelf Open where he lost to Nicolas Mahut in the first round. He also was awarded a wildcard into the men's doubles where he partnered compatriot Matt Reid. They upset the fourth seeds Draganja/Kontinen in the first round.

At Wimbledon, Hewitt was awarded a wildcard and was defeated by Jarkko Nieminen 6–3, 3–6, 6–4, 0–6, 9–11 in the first round of his eighteenth and final appearance at the tournament. It became his 44th five-set match of his grand slam career. Despite three straight breaks in the fifth set, Hewitt on serve faced and saved three match points at 4–5, and held serve each time until the 20th game of the fifth set. Afterwards both the crowd and Nieminen himself gave Hewitt a standing ovation. Partnering compatriot Thanasi Kokkinakis, the wild card duo reached the third round of the Wimbledon men's doubles with two five-set matches, including defeating the 15th seed, but they lost to the 4th seed. Hewitt played in the mixed doubles with compatriot Casey Dellacqua on a wild card and lost in the second round, seemingly ending his Wimbledon career.

Hewitt partnered Sam Groth to win Australia's Davis Cup quarterfinals doubles rubber against Kazakhstan in Darwin on 18 July. With their spectacular performance, Groth and Hewitt were selected to play the last two reverse-singles rubbers, replacing Kyrgios and Kokkinakis respectively. After Groth's win, Hewitt won the deciding fifth rubber against Nedovyesov to put Australia at 3–2 to reach the semi-finals. It was Australia's first win from 0–2 down since 1939.

Hewitt, on a wild card, defeated compatriot John-Patrick Smith 6–3 6–4 at the Citi Open in Washington D.C. in August. He lost in the second round of the US Open to Tomic in five sets despite having two match points. Hewitt partnered with Sam Groth lost a tough Davis Cup semi-finals doubles tie against the British Murray brothers in 5 sets. Todd Woodbridge hailed it as the "Best [doubles] I've watched for years."

2016: Retirement
Having previously announced his intentions to retire after the 2016 Australian Open, Hewitt confirmed that his final season would consist of that, the Hopman Cup and the exhibition World Tennis Challenge.

In his 20th appearance at the Australian Open, he won his first round match against fellow Australian James Duckworth in straight sets. He then lost in the second round in 3 straight competitive sets to 8th seed David Ferrer, 2–6, 4–6, 4–6. Post-match he was remembered by players including Roger Federer, Rafael Nadal, Andy Murray and Nick Kyrgios as a man who was at the top of the game for years, and continually displayed the fighting spirit that he became synonymous with.

He was made a Member of the Order of Australia in the awards announced on Australia Day.

In March Hewitt came out of retirement to replace the injured Nick Kyrgios in the first round Davis Cup against the US at the Kooyong Lawn Tennis Club. He played doubles with John Peers against the Bryan brothers. The Australian duo came back from two sets to love but lost the fifth set.

Hewitt was the subject of a book titled "Facing Hewitt" which features fifty interviews with professional tennis players who competed against him.

In June it was announced that Hewitt would be taking a wildcard into the Wimbledon doubles competition, playing alongside young compatriot Jordan Thompson. In the first round, the pair saved eight match points to defeat Nicolás Almagro and David Marrero 19–17 in the deciding set. However, they lost to the eighth seeds in the second round.

2018: Comeback in doubles 
In December 2017, it was announced that Hewitt would come out of retirement and accept a doubles wildcard with compatriot Sam Groth at the 2018 Australian Open.

Hewitt and Jordan Thompson accepted a wildcard to play Doubles at the 2018 Brisbane International. They lost in the first round to Grigor Dimitrov and Ryan Harrison 3–6, 6–1, [5–10].

Hewitt then played in the fast4 exhibition in Sydney where he lost to Grigor Dimitrov. Hewitt and Kyrgios then went on to win the doubles beating Alexander Zverev and Grigor Dimitrov. After that, he played the Tie Break Tens in Melbourne where he won his opening match against Novak Djokovic, before losing to world No. 1 Rafael Nadal.

In the Australian Open doubles, Hewitt and Groth made a run to the quarterfinals, including a win over third seeds Jean-Julien Rojer and Horia Tecău. This was his best doubles result at the Australian Open in his career.

Hewitt's doubles comeback continued with Lleyton playing doubles at the 2018 Estoril Open with Alex de Minaur where they defeated second seeds Michael Venus and Raven Klaasen before losing in the quarterfinals. He then reached the semi-finals of the 2018 Fuzion 100 Surbiton Trophy – Men's doubles with Alex Bolt before Venus and Klaasen gained revenge on Hewitt (this time with Alex Bolt) at the 2018 Rosmalen Grass Court Championships – Men's doubles.

Hewitt then teamed up with another Aussie, Nick Kyrgios at the 2018 Queen's Club Championships – Doubles tournament where they defeated number 3 seeds Nicolas Mahut and Pierre-Hugues Herbert before losing in the quarterfinals. At the 2018 Wimbledon Championships – Men's doubles, Hewitt was again wildcard with Alex Bolt however the pair again lost in the first round to Venus and Klaasen. After this loss, Hewitt teamed up with Jordan Thompson and lost in the first round of the 2018 Hall of Fame Tennis Championships in Newport.

Hewitt's last professional match of 2018 was in the 2018 Davis Cup World Group Play-offs against Austria where Hewitt paired up with experienced doubles specialist John Peers to defeat the Austrian team of doubles specialist Oliver Marach and experienced clay-courier Juergen Melzer.

2019: Continuing to play doubles 
In 2019, Hewitt played doubles at a number of tournaments. In a pairing with Jordan Thompson, they lost in the first round of the Sydney International. A week later he teamed up with John-Patrick Smith at the Australian Open, yet again losing in the first round. 
Hewitt and countryman Jordan Thompson received a wildcard to play at the Wimbledon Championships. They reached the second round before losing to R. Klaasen and M. Venus in straight sets.

Also that year, he played doubles in New York, Houston, Surbiton, and 's-Hertogenbosch, playing with the likes of Alexei Popyrin and Thompson yet again.

2020: Back in hometown of Adelaide 
Hewitt once again featured in the Australian summer of tennis, this time choosing to participate in the new Adelaide International, the first time he had played tour-tennis in his home town for over a decade. He partnered Jordan Thompson but lost in the first round to Cristian Garin and Juan Ignacio Londero. The two chose to compete at the Australian Open a week later, but lost in the first round in straight sets, to Korean duo Min-Kyu Song and Nam Ji-sung.

Hewitt continues to commentate matches at the Australian Open.

National representation

Davis Cup
Hewitt made his Davis Cup debut for Australia in the 1999 Davis Cup quarterfinals at age 18 against the United States in Chestnut Hill, Massachusetts. In the first rubber of the tie Hewitt faced No. 8 and Wimbledon quarter finalist Todd Martin. Hewitt caused a major upset over Martin and would go on to win his second singles rubber against Alex O'Brien as well. The great start to his Davis Cup career would continue in the 1999 semi-finals against Russia where he would record another two wins against Marat Safin and Yevgeny Kafelnikov. He would taste his first defeat in Davis Cup in the 1999 final against France but would become a Davis Cup champion anyway. In 2000 Hewitt and Australia would again make the Davis Cup final but fell to Spain in Barcelona.

In 2001 Hewitt would again be a part of the Australian team that would make the Davis Cup final but the Australians would lose the fifth rubber and hand France a 3–2 win. Determined to make amends for his last few finals, Hewitt led the Australian team to the 2003 Davis Cup final against Spain where he defeated Juan Carlos Ferrero in five sets. The team came away victorious 3–1 overall and Hewitt claimed his second Davis Cup title. By the age of 22, he had recorded more wins in Davis Cup singles than any other Australian player. Following the retirement of Pat Rafter and the semi-retirement of Mark Philippoussis, Hewitt would be forced to lead the Australian Davis Cup team with little success from his peers. In the 2006 quarterfinals in Melbourne, Hewitt defeated Belarusian Vladimir Voltchkov in just 91 minutes. Voltchkov said before the match that "Hewitt has no weapons to hurt me." Hewitt responded, "Voltchkov doesn't have a ranking [of 457] to hurt me." In the semi-finals in Buenos Aires on clay, Hewitt lost to Argentine José Acasuso in five sets.

Despite a world group semi-final appearance in 2006, Hewitt and Australia would be relegated to the Asia/Oceania region in 2008. Hewitt continued showed his commitment to the team by competing in the regional ties but the team fell in the playoff stages every year between 2008 and 2011. In the 2011 playoffs, he played against Roger Federer and Stanislas Wawrinka on a grass court in Sydney, losing both matches. In doubles, together with Chris Guccione, he was able to defeat Federer and Wawrinka, but this was not enough to take Australia to the World Group.

In 2012, Hewitt won his single and doubles match against China in February, which allowed Australia to return to the playoffs where they lost to Germany. After defeating Chinese Taipei and Uzbekistan, Australia earned the right to get to the playoffs again in 2013. They ended up routing Poland 4–1 on their soil including a convincing 6–1 6–3 6–2 win for Hewitt over recent Wimbledon quarterfinalist Łukasz Kubot. In 2014, Australia crashed out 5–0 in the World Group first round on the French clay of La Roche sur Yon. Jo-Wilfried Tsonga beat Hewitt both in singles and doubles. Perth's grass courts would then be hosting yet another playoff tie for Australia in September 2014. Hewitt won both his singles match (against Farrukh Dustov) and the subsequent doubles rubber (partnering Chris Guccione v. Dustov and Istomin) in straight sets while up and coming Nick Kyrgios won his encounter with Denis Istomin to give Australia an unassailable 3–0 lead over Uzbekistan, thus enabling their country to return to the World Group in 2015. Sam Groth and Nick Kyrgios wrapped up a 5–0 victory a day later. Australia will open their 2015 campaign in Czech Republic for a 6–8 March tie that is one of two worst-case scenarios for Australia.

Hewitt played the Davis Cup match against Great Britain in the semi-finals of the 2015 Davis Cup. He played doubles with Sam Groth losing in five sets to brothers Andy and Jamie Murray.

He came out of retirement to play the first round match against the United States at the 2016 Davis Cup as a player-captain, where he and partner John Peers lost to the Bryan brothers in a five-setter.

He competed in the 2018 Davis Cup World Group Play-offs, again as a player-captain in doubles with Peers. They won the rubber against the Austrian duo Oliver Marach and Jürgen Melzer in four sets.

Hewitt is the sole holder of several Australian Davis Cup records, which include most wins, most singles wins, most ties played and most years played. His Davis Cup career has included wins over players who were top ten at the time, which include Todd Martin, Marat Safin, Yevgeny Kafelnikov, Roger Federer, Gustavo Kuerten, Sébastien Grosjean and Juan Carlos Ferrero.

World Team Cup

Hewitt made his World Team Cup debut for Australia in 2000 at the age of 19. He recorded two singles victories over Albert Costa and Marcelo Ríos but fell to Yevgeny Kafelnikov in his last group stage match. Hewitt returned to the World Team Cup in 2001 and led Australia to the title by recording singles wins over Àlex Corretja, Magnus Norman, Tommy Haas in the group stages. In the final Hewitt defeated No. 2 Marat Safin.

Hewitt made his third appearance at the tournament in 2003 where he entered as the No. 1 singles player and went undefeated in his singles matches by recording wins over Jiří Novák, James Blake and Carlos Moyá but it was not enough to send Australia through to the final.

Fresh from their 2003 Davis Cup victory, Hewitt and Mark Philippoussis entered the 2004 World Team Cup with high hopes. In the group stages Hewitt recorded victories over Robby Ginepri and Martin Verkerk but fell to Gastón Gaudio in his last group singles match. Despite the loss, Australia still advanced to the final where Hewitt would lose to Fernando González and Australia would lose the final 2–1.

After a six-year hiatus Hewitt returned to compete in the 2010 World Team Cup and won his first match against John Isner but fell to Nicolás Almagro in his last match.

Olympics
A 19-year-old Hewitt entered his first Olympics in 2000 and was given the fourth seeding in the draw. Hewitt was considered a strong favorite for a medal given his victory at the Sydney International earlier in the year but despite competing in his home nation Hewitt went out in the first round to Max Mirnyi 6–3 6–3. Hewitt elected not to compete in the 2004 Athens Olympic Games, deciding instead to focus on the 2004 US Open which would result in a runner-up showing. He would return for his second Olympic Games in Beijing for both the singles and doubles competitions. A first round 7–5 7–6 victory over Jonas Björkman would set up a second round clash with the number 2 seed Rafael Nadal. Nadal eliminated Hewitt in the second round 6–1 6–2 and would go on to win the singles gold medal. Pairing up with Chris Guccione in the doubles, the team would record victories over Agustín Calleri/Juan Mónaco and Rafael Nadal/Tommy Robredo before falling to the Bryan brothers in the quarterfinals.

Hewitt competed in his third olympics in London 2012 where he entered the men's singles event and defeated Ukrainian Sergiy Stakhovsky in the first round. He was the only Australian in any tennis event to progress past the first round. In the second round Hewitt took out 13th seeded Croatian Marin Čilić. In the third round Hewitt stunned the tennis world when he won the first set against the number 2 ranked Novak Djokovic, he would end up falling in three sets. He also sent an application to the International Olympic Committee to enter the men's doubles competition with Chris Guccione but the application was rejected. Following his men's doubles rejection, Hewitt decided to apply for a spot in the mixed doubles competition with Sam Stosur. The pair were granted entry and defeated Polish pair Marcin Matkowski and Agnieszka Radwańska in the first round. In the quarterfinals, Hewitt/Stosur faced British pair Andy Murray and Laura Robson, they would lose the encounter.

Coaches
Peter Smith, Darren Cahill, Jason Stoltenberg, Roger Rasheed, Scott Draper, Tony Roche, Nathan Healey and Brett Smith, Tony Roche and Peter Luczak are all former coaches of Hewitt.

Hewitt's coaches in his time on the ATP Tour:
 Peter Smith (January 1997 – December 1998)
 Darren Cahill (December 1998 – December 2001)
 Jason Stoltenberg (December 2001 – June 2003)
 Roger Rasheed (June 2003 – January 2007)
 Scott Draper (January 2007)
 Tony Roche (July 2007 – August 2009)
 Nathan Healey (August 2009 – August 2010)
 Brett Smith (August 2010 – November 2010)
 Tony Roche (November 2010 – January 2016)
 Peter Luczak (January 2013 – January 2016)

Rivalries

Hewitt vs Federer
Hewitt and Roger Federer played each other on 27 occasions. Early in their careers, Hewitt dominated Federer, winning seven of their first nine meetings, including a victory from two sets down in the 2003 Davis Cup semi-final, which allowed Australia to defeat Switzerland. However, from 2004 onward, Federer dominated the rivalry, winning 16 of the last 18 meetings to finish with an 18–9 overall head-to-head record. This is Hewitt's longest rivalry as these two first played each other as juniors in 1996. They met in one Grand Slam final, the 2004 US Open final, where Federer won his first US Open title in a lopsided encounter in which Federer won the first and third sets 6–0 and the second set on a tiebreak. Federer met Hewitt at six of the Grand Slam tournaments in which he lifted the trophy, including all five of his triumphs between 2004 and 2005. Their last meeting was at the 2014 Brisbane International, where Hewitt triumphed over Federer in three sets, for his first title since 2010, when he also beat Federer to the Halle title.

Hewitt and Federer teamed up in the men's doubles at Wimbledon in 1999. They got to the third round before losing to Jonas Björkman and Pat Rafter.

Hewitt vs Roddick
Hewitt's second longest rivalry was against American Andy Roddick, in which the two played on 14 occasions. Early on, Hewitt dominated the rivalry, with six wins from their first seven meetings. One of those wins included a five-set victory at the 2001 US Open, the tournament in which Hewitt captured his first Singles Grand Slam title. In later years, Roddick began to dominate Hewitt, with the rivalry finishing at 7 wins each.

Hewitt vs Argentinian players
A rivalry and feud between Hewitt and Argentinian tennis players began at the 2002 Wimbledon final where Hewitt defeated Argentina's David Nalbandian in straight sets. The rivalry would hit boiling point in 2005 over a series of matches spread between the 2005 Australian Open and the 2005 Davis Cup Quarterfinals between Australia and Argentina. In the third round of 2005 Australian Open Hewitt faced Argentinian Juan Ignacio Chela in which Hewitt fired up Chela with his over-zealous celebrations for Chela's unforced errors, causing the Argentinian to spit at Hewitt during a change of ends. Hewitt would then face David Nalbandian in the quarterfinals on Australia Day with Hewitt coming out victorious 10–8 in the fifth set. Later in 2005 Hewitt would face Guillermo Coria in the Davis Cup quarterfinals, where their rivalry would flare up, however, die down the following year in the 2006 Davis Cup semi-finals, where Argentina came out victorious 5–0 over Hewitt and the Australians.

Playing style

Hewitt is a defensive counterpuncher. He typically likes to stay back towards the baseline during a rally and will usually approach the net only to catch a short reply or drop shot from his opponent. Hewitt's lack of penetration in his groundstrokes, most notably in his forehand, a typically dominant shot in most male players, forces him to rely on placement rather than simply "dominating" the point. At the 2004 Cincinnati Masters Final, commentator MaliVai Washington said that Hewitt was even more difficult to "ace" than Agassi because he gets more returns in play. Hewitt's tactics typically involve putting difficult service returns in play, consistently chasing down attempted winning shots from his opponent, and keeping the ball deep until he feels he can hit a winner.

Although he is known primarily as a baseliner, Hewitt is a skilled volleyer and is known for having one of the best overhead smashes in the game. His signature shot, however, is the offensive topspin lob, a shot that he executes efficiently off both wings when his opponent approaches the net. US Davis Cup captain Patrick McEnroe, Jim Courier and Tim Henman have all described Hewitt's lob as being the best in the world (although Henman has since declared Andy Murray to have succeeded him). In Andre Agassi's book "Open", Hewitt is described as one of the best shot selectors in the history of Men's Tennis.

Awards
 2001 – ATP Player of the Year
 2001 – Most Popular South Australian
 2002 – ATP Player of the Year
 2002 – Australia's Male Athlete
 2002 – ESPY Best Male Tennis Player
 2003 – Young Australian of the Year
 2003 – Vogue Australia Sportsman of the Year
 2003 – Most Popular South Australian
 2011 – Newcombe Medal. Spirit of Tennis Award
 2013 – Newcombe Medal. Most outstanding Australian player in 2013
 Davis Cup Commitment Award
 2016 – Member of the Order of Australia for significant service to tennis as a player at the national and international level, and to the community.

Equipment
In July 2000, Hewitt signed a multiyear endorsement deal with Nike. He is currently sponsored by American athletic apparel company Athletic DNA and the Japanese sports manufacturer Yonex, with whom he signed a "Head to Toe" deal in late 2005. Hewitt has used Yonex racquets as early as 2000, having used the Yonex Super RD Tour 95. Yonex provides Hewitt's racquets, shoes and accessories. Hewitt's Yonex shoes (SHT-306) are inscribed with his nickname "Rusty" along with an image of an Australian flag. As of 7 August 2007, his first appearance with a new racquet at the Montreal Masters, Hewitt used to use the Yonex RQiS 1 Tour. He used to use the Yonex RDS tour 90 Model, but switched to the Yonex RDiS 100 mid in 2009. In 2011, he switched to Yonex VCORE 95 D, using a grip size of 4 3/8 (L3). Since mid-2011, he began alternating between Yonex, Nike, Adidas, Asics and Fila shoes.

Personal life
Hewitt is a keen supporter of Australian rules football, having played the game earlier in his career, and is currently the joint No. 1 ticket holder for the Adelaide Crows, alongside MP Kate Ellis. He had once had a close friendship with Crows star Andrew McLeod, but this broke down amid much public controversy in 2005. Hewitt had produced a DVD titled Lleyton Hewitt: The Other Side which precipitated the falling out between him and McLeod over filming of certain Aboriginal sites.

Hewitt and Belgian tennis player Kim Clijsters started a relationship in January 2000, during the Australian Open. The two announced their engagement just before Christmas 2003, but separated in October 2004, cancelling a planned February 2005 wedding.

On 30 January 2005, shortly after losing the 2005 Australian Open final to Marat Safin, Hewitt proposed to Australian actress Bec Cartwright after they had been dating for six weeks. They married on 21 July 2005 at the Sydney Opera House and they have three children together.

In late 2008, to extend his tennis career and reduce the amount of tax he would otherwise have had to pay, Hewitt relocated his family for the European and North American season to their home in the Old Fort Bay estate, in Nassau, Bahamas.

Hewitt has a nickname, "Rusty", which was given to him by Darren Cahill who at the time thought Hewitt resembled the character Rusty, from the National Lampoon film series. Hewitt has also been given the nickname 'Rocky' by fans, which originated from his shouts of "C'mon Balboa", in reference to the character Rocky Balboa from the Sylvester Stallone film Rocky. Hewitt has also been compared to the character.

In April 2021, his twelve year old son, Cruz Hewitt, won the Australian junior tennis clay-court title in Canberra.

In December 2021, Hewitt sold their family home in Toorak (Victoria), and purchased a new house in Burleigh Heads (Queensland) where he and his family now live.

Controversies

Hewitt has been involved in several public controversies. He was involved in a racism dispute while playing James Blake at the 2001 US Open. After being foot-faulted twice by a black linesman on crucial points in the third set, Hewitt was accused of dragging race into the situation by suggesting the similarity in skin colour of Blake and the official was playing a part in the decision to penalise him.

At the 2001 French Open Hewitt twice called the Chair Umpire and net judge "spastics" and was subsequently forced to apologise following a public backlash.

Hewitt's constant "c'mons" when he won a point or his opponents made an error have been remarked upon as poor sportsmanship by opponents and media commentators. Notably this behaviour particularly riled his 2005 Australian Open second-round opponent James Blake.

Career statistics

Singles performance timeline

Grand Slam finals

Singles: 4 (2–2)

Doubles: 1 (1–0)

Mixed doubles: 1 (0–1)

Year-end championships finals

Singles: 3 (2–1)

Masters Series finals

Singles: 7 (2–5)

Records

See also

 Lleyton Hewitt career statistics
 Wimbledon gentleman's singles champions
 US Open men's singles champions
 List of Grand Slam men's singles champions

References

External links

 
 
 
 
Official website

Australian expatriates in the Bahamas
Australian male tennis players
Olympic tennis players of Australia
Tennis players from Adelaide

Tennis players from Sydney

Tennis players at the 2000 Summer Olympics
Tennis players at the 2008 Summer Olympics
Tennis players at the 2012 Summer Olympics
US Open (tennis) champions
Wimbledon champions
1981 births
Living people
Hopman Cup competitors
Australian Institute of Sport tennis players
Grand Slam (tennis) champions in men's singles
Grand Slam (tennis) champions in men's doubles
Members of the Order of Australia
People educated at Immanuel College, Adelaide
ATP number 1 ranked singles tennis players
ITF World Champions